The NFL Top 100 Players of 2015 was the fifth season in the series. It ended with reigning NFL Defensive Player of the Year J. J. Watt being ranked #1, thus marking the first year in the history of the countdown that the reigning NFL MVP was not ranked #1 (Aaron Rodgers was ranked #2). Super Bowl MVP Tom Brady was ranked #3.

Episode list

The list

References 

National Football League trophies and awards
National Football League records and achievements
National Football League lists